Stole Dimitrievski (born 25 December 1993) is a Macedonian professional footballer who plays as a goalkeeper for Spanish La Liga club Rayo Vallecano and the North Macedonia national team.

After starting off at Rabotnički in 2010, he has spent most of his career in Spain. Dimitrievski earned 28 caps for Macedonia at youth level, and made his senior international debut in 2015. He represented the nation at UEFA Euro 2020, their first major tournament.

Club career

Early career
Born in Kumanovo, Dimitrievski graduated from Rabotnički's youth setup. He made his debut for the club on 24 October 2010, starting in a 2–0 home win against Vardar.

Dimitrievski was Rabotnički's first-choice during the 2011–12 season, also appearing with the side in the season's UEFA Europa League. He signed a contract with Italian Serie A club Udinese on 23 August 2011, with the deal only being effective in December.

Granada
On 30 December 2011, Dimitrievski was loaned to Cádiz. However, he only appeared with the reserves in Tercera División and moved to another reserve team, Granada B in the summer of 2012. On 12 October 2013, he was the last of three of the team's players sent off in a 2–1 loss at Atlético Sanluqueño for the season's Segunda División B.

On 23 August 2014, after profiting from Roberto's suspension and Oier Olazábal's injury, Dimitrievski made his first team – and La Liga – debut, starting in a 2–1 home win against Deportivo La Coruña. However, his spell at the club was mainly associated with the B-side.

Gimnàstic
On 16 August 2016, Dimitrievski signed a two-year contract with Segunda División club Gimnàstic, mainly as a cover to injured Manolo Reina. He made his debut on 7 September in the second round of the Copa del Rey, a 1–0 extra-time win at home to Numancia.

After Sebastián Saja's poor run of form, Dimitrievski became a regular starter for Gimnàstic in October 2016, but his run only lasted until December as Reina returned from injury. On 13 August 2017, after the latter's departure, he extended his contract until 2020.

Rayo Vallecano
On 31 August 2018, Dimitrievski was loaned to Rayo Vallecano in the top flight, for one year. Initially a backup to Alberto García, he became the club's first-choice in November.

On 31 January 2019, Dimitrievski signed a permanent three-and-a-half-year contract with the club. He was the primary goalkeeper for their 2020–21 Segunda División promotion season, though Luca Zidane was in goal for the playoffs due to UEFA Euro 2020.

International career
After representing Macedonia at under-17, under-19 and under-21 levels, Dimitrievski made his senior international debut on 12 November 2015, starting in a 4–1 friendly win over Montenegro at the Philip II National Arena. In May 2021, he was called up for the delayed UEFA Euro 2020 finals, his country's first major tournament. He played all three games in a group stage elimination, and saved a penalty from Ruslan Malinovskyi in a 2–1 loss to Ukraine in Bucharest.

Career statistics

Club

International

Notes

References

External links

Profile at Macedonian Football 

1993 births
Living people
Sportspeople from Kumanovo
Macedonian footballers
Association football goalkeepers
Macedonian First Football League players
FK Rabotnički players
La Liga players
Segunda División players
Segunda División B players
Tercera División players
Club Recreativo Granada players
Cádiz CF B players
Granada CF footballers
Gimnàstic de Tarragona footballers
Rayo Vallecano players
Macedonian expatriate footballers
Expatriate footballers in Spain
Macedonian expatriate sportspeople in Spain
North Macedonia youth international footballers
North Macedonia under-21 international footballers
North Macedonia international footballers
UEFA Euro 2020 players